is a 1986 Japanese horror film in the "splatter-eros" subgenre of pink film. Most of the sex scenes are fogged, due to censorship in Japan.

Plot summary 
A group of photographers and their models go to a forest retreat. They engage in S&M play and much softcore sex. Eventually they get picked off one-by-one by a filth-covered "demon" with an unnaturally large penis.

In the end, all the film crews perish and only the main actress, Rei, survives. Nevertheless, she becomes heavily pregnant with the demon’s child. Rei looks over the sea and wonders what will come out of her womb. She decides that she is actually looking forward to see it just before the surrounding rock formations around her bust into flame.

Cast 
 Saeko Kizuki as Rei
 Naomi Hagio as Kazuyo
 Megumi Kawashima as Kei
 Osamu Tsuruoka as Itomura
 Daiki Katô as Asaoka
 Hideki Takahashi as Tachikawa
 Kazuhiko Goda as murderer

Production 
During the 1980s, slasher film-makers had begun adding increasing amounts of sexuality into their movies. Working in the pink film genre, director Kazuo "Gaira" Komizu decided to inject elements of horror into these softcore pornographic productions. The film became a box-office success.

Release 
Along with its sequel, Entrails of a Beautiful Woman, Entrails of a Virgin became a notorious example of the low-quality blackmarket VHS copies which American enthusiasts traded in the 1980s. These copies usually had no English subtitles. The film was released on DVD first on the Japan Shock label in PAL format, and then by Synapse Films in NTSC. The Synapse release was a restored, widescreen version.

Critical reception 
In his Asia Shock; Horror and Dark Cinema from Japan, Korea, Hong Kong, and Thailand, Patrick Galloway says that Komizu's mix of sex and horror works as a film. He describes the film as "essentially one long fuck-fest interspersed with the occasional impaling, hanging or beheading..." and concludes: "It's all rather sordid and there's a definite misanthropy to the film reminiscent of Henri-Georges Clouzot (Diabolique), but somehow the elements click into place, making for an uncomfortable-yet-can't-look-away film experience".

Sequel 
One of a series of three by director Kazuo "Gaira" Komizu, the other two were the considerably more graphic and hardcore Entrails of a Beautiful Woman (1986), as well as Female Inquisitor (1987).

Bibliography

References

External links 
 
 

1986 films
BDSM in films
1986 horror films
1980s monster movies
Nikkatsu Roman Porno
Nikkatsu films
Erotic horror films
1980s Japanese films